Simmineh (also Romanized as Sīmmīneh and Simineh) is a city in, and the capital of, Simmineh District of Bukan County, West Azerbaijan province, Iran. At the 2006 census, its population was 957 in 188 households. The following census in 2011 counted 1,173 people in 274 households. The latest census in 2016 showed a population of 1,345 people in 369 households.

References 

Bukan County

Cities in West Azerbaijan Province

Populated places in West Azerbaijan Province

Populated places in Bukan County